Cycle-ball, also known as "radball" (from German), is a sport similar to association football played on bicycles.  The two people on each team ride a fixed gear bicycle with no brakes or freewheel. The ball is controlled by the bike and the head, except when defending the goal.

History
The sport was introduced in 1893 by a German-American, Nicholas Edward Kaufmann. Its first world championships were in 1929. Cycle-ball is popular in Austria, Belgium, the Czech Republic, France, Germany, Japan, the Netherlands, Russia and Switzerland. The most successful players were the Pospíšil brothers of Czechoslovakia, world champions 20 times between 1965 and 1988.

Closely related is artistic cycling in which the athletes perform a kind of gymnastics on cycles.

Championships
UCI Indoor Cycling World Championships
Cycle-ball at the 2005 and 2007 Asian Indoor Games
Cycle-ball at the 1989 World Games

See also
Cycle polo
Hardcourt Bike Polo

External links
 List with over 420 cycle-ball clubs
 UCI's introduction to cycle-ball and artistic cycling
 Cycle-Ball – When Cycling Met Football
 2011 Dogo News Article

Team sports
Cycle sport
Association football variants
Games and sports introduced in the 1890s